Ghanem Zrelly (born 6 December 1984), is a Tunisian actor. He is best known for the roles in the films Thala My Love, Day of the Falcon, Beauty and the Dogs and In Paradox.

Career
In 2007, he made film debut with the film Thirty. He played the supportive role of 'Habib Bourguiba'. In the next year, he made television debut with the serial Njoum Ellil and played the role 'Qais'. In 2009, he graduated from the Institut Superieur d' Art Dramatique in Tunisia.

In 2016, he won the award for the Best Male Role for his role 'Mehdi' in the film Narcisse directed by Sonia Chamkhi during the fifth edition of the Maghrebian Film Festival organized in Oujda, Morocco. 

In 2017, he starred in the critically acclaimed film Beauty and the Dogs where he played the lead role 'Youssef'. The film premieres in Cannes Film Festival in the 'Un Certain Regard' section.

Filmography

See also
 Tunivisions

References

External links
 

Living people
Tunisian male film actors
1984 births